Svetlana Ishkova (born 13 December 1978) is an Argentine diver. She competed in the women's 3 metre springboard event at the 2000 Summer Olympics.

References

1978 births
Living people
Argentine female divers
Olympic divers of Argentina
Divers at the 2000 Summer Olympics
Place of birth missing (living people)